Synotaxus is a genus of araneomorph spiders in the family Synotaxidae that was first described by Eugène Louis Simon in 1895. Originally placed with the tangle web spiders, it was moved to the monotypic family Synotaxidae in 2017.

Description 
Spiders in this genus have a long, green abdomen, which extends to varying degrees beyond the spinnerets. The carapace is wide and flat, and they have long, delicate legs with the first being the longest. The legs and body are both covered in long, fine setae. 

The posterior lateral spinnerets bear enlarged aggregate gland spigots, and the male pedipalp has a stout patellar spur. The palpal femur, patella and tibia bear strong, often greatly enlarged, macrosetae.

Species
 it contains eleven species, found in South America, Panama, Costa Rica, and on Trinidad:

 Synotaxus bonaldoi Santos & Rheims, 2005 – Brazil
 Synotaxus brescoviti Santos & Rheims, 2005 – Brazil
 Synotaxus ecuadorensis Exline, 1950 – Costa Rica to Ecuador
 Synotaxus itabaiana Santos & Rheims, 2005 – Brazil
 Synotaxus jaraguari Souza, Brescovit & Araujo, 2017 – Brazil
 Synotaxus leticia Exline & Levi, 1965 – Colombia
 Synotaxus longicaudatus (Keyserling, 1891) – Brazil
 Synotaxus monoceros (Caporiacco, 1947) – Trinidad, Guyana, Brazil
 Synotaxus siolii Santos & Rheims, 2005 – Brazil
 Synotaxus turbinatus Simon, 1895 (type) – Panama to Ecuador
 Synotaxus waiwai Agnarsson, 2003 – Guyana, Brazil, Paraguay

Habitat and Distribution 
Spiders in this genus are found in the understory of wet forests in South America, where they construct their webs between the leaves of trees or bushes, well above the forest floor.

References

Araneomorphae genera
Synotaxidae